The 2015–16 Korfball League & Promotion Division promotion/relegation play-off is played between the number 9 of the England Korfball League and the top two teams of the Promotion Division North & West and South & East. In North & West Bristol Thunder and Birmingham City qualified. In South & East Bearsted and Cambridge Tigers qualified.
KV (1st) and Bearsted (2nd) both were promoted to the England Korfball League 2016-17 Season starting in November 2016.

Teams

A total of 5 teams will be taking part in the play-off.

Table

Results

Day 1

Day 2

Controversies

In the last 60 seconds of a tense game between Birmingham City and Cambridge Tigers with the score level at 6-6. Birmingham needed a win for a small chance of promotion, a Cambridge win would give them almost certain promotion to the EKL. Cambridge won a free-pass, which was missed however, followed up by a running in shot by Josh Dawes, giving them the lead. With 30 seconds to go, Birmingham were awarded a penalty which was missed. With 6 seconds to go Cambridge, having collected the missed penalty, were passing the ball out of defence and the referee called up for time wasting, the clock then stopped at 3 seconds, which allowed Birmingham to take an instant shot which was scored by Jess Beale to level the match. The match finished 7-7, therefore giving Bearsted a chance to secure a place in next seasons EKL, they went on to beat Bristol Thunder 13-7 in their final game, promoting them.

References

Korfball in England
2015 in korfball
Korfball
2016 in korfball
2016 in English sport